Cernydd Carmel is a Site of Special Scientific Interest in Carmarthenshire,  Wales.

Carmel Woods National Nature Reserve is located on part of the SSSI, and is open to the public.

Pant-y-Llyn at Cernydd Carmel is the only turlough in Britain, a type of seasonal lake found in limestone areas, the other examples of which are in Ireland. Pant-y-Llyn fills to a depth of about  each autumn, and remains full until it empties completely into a sink hole the following summer. There are no surface drainage streams.

See also
List of Sites of Special Scientific Interest in Carmarthen & Dinefwr

References

Sites of Special Scientific Interest in Carmarthen & Dinefwr